Manoel Pessanha (23 March 1918 – 16 August 2003), known as Lelé, was a Brazilian footballer. He played in four matches for the Brazil national football team from 1940 to 1945. He was also part of Brazil's squad for the 1946 South American Championship.

References

1918 births
2003 deaths
Brazilian footballers
Brazil international footballers
Place of birth missing
Association footballers not categorized by position